Walter Heath (3 December 1897 – 4 December 1965) was an English cricketer. He played seven first-class matches for Surrey between 1919 and 1924.

See also
 List of Surrey County Cricket Club players

References

External links
 

1897 births
1965 deaths
English cricketers
Surrey cricketers
People from Streatham
Cricketers from Greater London
H. D. G. Leveson Gower's XI cricketers
Gentlemen of the South cricketers
P. F. Warner's XI cricketers